A Constipated Monkey is the debut studio album by American rapper Kurious from Harlem. It was released on January 18, 1994 through Hoppoh Recordings/Columbia Records/Sony Music Entertainment. Recording sessions took place in New York at Chung King Studios, Rampant Recording Studio and LGK Studios. Production was handled by The Beatnuts, Stimulated Dummies, Pete Nice and DJ Richie Rich of 3rd Bass, and Bosco Money of Downtown Science. It features guest appearances from Casual, MF Grimm, Psycho Les, Kadi and The Omen. The album peaked at #68 on the Top R&B/Hip-Hop Albums and #31 on the Heatseekers Albums in the United States. A Constipated Monkey produced three singles: "Walk Like a Duck", "Uptown Shit" and "I'm Kurious".

Track listing

* Production for "Fresh Out the Box" was mistakenly credited to The Beatnuts. Both the writing credits and comments by Dante Ross show that it was produced by the Stimulated Dummies.

Charts

References

External links

1994 debut albums
Kurious albums
Columbia Records albums
Albums produced by the Beatnuts
Albums produced by Dante Ross
Albums produced by John Gamble (record producer)
Albums recorded at Chung King Studios